Mehmet Cengiz Öz (born June 11, 1960), known professionally as Dr. Oz, is an American television personality, author, professor emeritus of cardiothoracic surgery at Columbia University, and former political candidate.

The son of Turkish immigrants, Oz was raised in Wilmington, Delaware, and graduated from Harvard University and the University of Pennsylvania. A dual citizen of the U.S. and Turkey, Oz served in the Turkish Army during the 1980s for 60 days of mandatory training, specifically for citizens who reside in foreign countries, to maintain his Turkish citizenship. He subsequently began his residency in surgery at Columbia University Irving Medical Center in 1986. In 2001, he became a professor of surgery at Columbia University, and later retired to professor emeritus in 2018. In 2003, Oprah Winfrey was the first guest on the Discovery Channel series Second Opinion with Dr. Oz, and he was a regular guest on The Oprah Winfrey Show, making more than sixty appearances. In 2009, The Dr. Oz Show, a daily television program about medical matters and health, was launched by Winfrey's Harpo Productions and Sony Pictures Television, running for 13 seasons. Oz's promotion of pseudoscience, including on the topics of alternative medicine, faith healing, and various paranormal beliefs, has earned him criticism from a number of medical publications and physicians.

Oz ran in the 2022 U.S. Senate election in Pennsylvania as a conservative Republican. Oz lost the election to Democratic Lieutenant Governor John Fetterman. Oz was the first Muslim candidate to be nominated by either major party for U.S. Senate.

Early life and education
Mehmet Oz was born in 1960 in Cleveland, Ohio, to Suna and Mustafa Öz, who had emigrated from Konya Province, Turkey. Oz has said that he was named after Mehmed the Conqueror, the Ottoman sultan who conquered Constantinople in 1453. Mustafa was born in Bozkır, a small town in southern Turkey, and graduated at the top of his class at Cerrahpaşa Medical School in 1950 and moved to the United States to join the general residency program at Case Western Reserve University in Cleveland, where Mehmet was born. Mustafa trained in cardiothoracic surgery at Emory University in Atlanta and was chief of thoracic surgery at the Medical Center of Delaware for several years before moving back to Turkey. Suna ( Atabay), who comes from a wealthy Istanbul family, is the daughter of a pharmacist with Circassian (Shapsug) descent on her mother's side. Oz has said, "My mother is Circassian, her great grandmother was brought from the Caucasus to Istanbul as a concubine in Sultan Mahmud II's harem". After Mahmud died, she married an imam. Oz has two sisters, Seval Öz and Nazlim Öz. Oz grew up in a mixed Muslim environment where his father's family practiced more traditional Islam, while his mother's family were more secular Muslims. 

As a child, he spent summers in Turkey and served in the Turkish Army for 60 days after college to maintain his dual citizenship.

Oz was educated at Tower Hill School in Wilmington, Delaware. In 1982, he received his undergraduate degree in biology magna cum laude at Harvard University. He played safety on Harvard's football team and was a goalkeeper on the men's varsity water polo team. In 1986, he obtained MD and MBA degrees from the University of Pennsylvania School of Medicine and Penn's Wharton School. He was awarded the Captain's Athletic Award for leadership in college and was class president and then student body president during medical school.

Medical career

Oz began his medical career with a residency at the Presbyterian Hospital in New York City, then affiliated with Columbia University, in 1986 after being hired by Eric Rose. In April 1995, Oz and his colleague Jerry Whitworth founded the Cardiac Complementary Care Center to provide various types of alternative medicine to heart disease patients. The publicity of Oz's work created tension with hospital administration, who expressed alarm at Oz's use of therapeutic touch, which he dropped in response to their objections.

In 1996, Oz and Rose received media publicity following their work on a successful heart transplant for Frank Torre, brother of New York Yankees manager Joe Torre, during the 1996 World Series, which the Yankees won. Rose later remarked that while he did not enjoy the media attention, Oz "loved it". Meanwhile, Oz and Whitworth's professional relationship grew strained due to the attention Oz was receiving; Whitworth later recounted in an interview with Vox that he asked Oz to "stop the media circus". In 2000, Whitworth departed the Cardiac Complementary Care Center, which Oz reopened that same year as the Cardiovascular Institute and Integrative Medicine Program at the NewYork-Presbyterian Hospital, where he served as director.

Oz became a professor at the Columbia University Vagelos College of Physicians and Surgeons in 2001, a title he held until 2018, when his current title changed to professor emeritus.

He has helped develop numerous devices and procedures related to heart surgery, including the MitraClip and the left ventricular assist device (LVAD), and by 2015 held a number of patents related to heart surgery.

In 2003, Oz was scheduled to present medical research regarding heart bypass surgery and heart-lung machines to the yearly conference of the American Association for Thoracic Surgery, but the presentation was withdrawn and for two years he was banned from further presentations to the association or publishing work in the association's medical journal. Association officials said that the ban was not due to academic dishonesty, but in part due to Oz's team having changed the methodology of the study from what was agreed upon for presentation. Oz's 2022 political campaign said that the incident was due to Oz's team having extended "the scope of the work with more patients". Anonymous sources cited by The Washington Post said that another reason for the rejection was due to having data from too few test subjects to reach a strong conclusion.

In 2010, Oz joined Jeff Arnold as co-founder of Sharecare, Inc. In 2015, a group of 10 physicians demanded Columbia remove Oz from the faculty for his alleged "disdain for science and for evidence-based medicine". Columbia defended Oz and dismissed calls for his termination, saying that they are "committed to the principle of academic freedom and to upholding faculty members' freedom of expression". Oz responded to the call, saying "I bring the public information that will help them on their path to be their best selves" and that his show provides "multiple points of view, including mine, which is offered without conflict of interest."

Television career

Oz appeared as a health expert on The Oprah Winfrey Show for five seasons. In 2009, Winfrey offered to produce a syndicated series hosted by him through her company, Harpo Productions. The Dr. Oz Show debuted on September 14, 2009, distributed by Sony Pictures Television.

On the show, Oz addressed issues like Type 2 diabetes and promoted resveratrol supplements, which he claimed were anti-aging. His Transplant! television series won both a Freddie and a Silver Telly award. He was a consultant on heart transplantation for Denzel Washington's John Q.

In January 2011, Oz premiered as part of a weekly show on OWN called "Oprah's Allstars". In each episode, he, Suze Orman, and Dr. Phil answer various questions about life, health and finance. In the 2010s he also did a health segment on 1010 WINS titled "Your Daily Dose".

On October 23, 2014, Surgeon Oz, showing Oz's career as a surgeon, debuted on OWN.

In September 2016, during his presidential campaign, Donald Trump appeared on The Dr. Oz Show. In the lead-up to the show's taping, Oz promoted Trump's appearance with a claim that Oz would assess medical records submitted to the show by Trump and reveal his assessment on the show. CNN speculated that Trump's appearance aimed to appeal to The Dr. Oz Shows large female viewership. Oz would later be appointed to the President's Council on Sports, Fitness, and Nutrition in 2018 during Trump's administration.

Beginning on March 22, 2021, Oz guest-hosted the trivia television game show Jeopardy! for two weeks. The decision to make him a guest host was met with criticism from Jeopardy! fans and former contestants.

The Dr. Oz Show aired its final episode on January 14, 2022, after over a decade on the air.

Medical claims and controversies

Oz's image and quotes have been exploited by many weight loss product scammers. While he himself has not been found to be involved in these scams, he has made statements that were exploited by scammers. During a 2014 Senate hearing on consumer protection, Senator Claire McCaskill said that "the scientific community is almost monolithic against you" for airing segments on weight loss products that are later cited in advertisements, concluding that Oz plays a role, intentional or not, in perpetuating these scams, and that she is "concerned that you are melding medical advice, news, and entertainment in a way that harms consumers." He has been a spokesman and advisor for the website RealAge.com, which The New York Times has criticized for its pharmaceutical marketing practices.

During the COVID-19 pandemic, Oz's television appearances influenced Trump's decision-making, and he became an informal advisor to the Trump administration. Oz had promoted the use of hydroxychloroquine, an antimalarial drug, as a cure for COVID-19 on more than 25 Fox News broadcasts in March and April 2020. Trump claimed to be taking the drug in May 2020. In June 2020, the Food and Drug Administration revoked emergency use authorization of hydroxychloroquine, saying that it was "no longer reasonable to believe" that the drug was effective against COVID-19 or that its benefits outweighed "known and potential risks". Oz also owns at least $630,000 of stock in two companies that manufacture or distribute hydroxychloroquine, Thermo Fisher and McKesson Corporation.

In April 2020, Oz appeared on Fox News with Sean Hannity and said that reopening schools in the United States might be worth the increased number of deaths it would cause. Referencing an article published in the medical journal The Lancet, Oz said, "I just saw a nice piece in The Lancet [medical journal] arguing that the opening of schools may only cost us 2–3% in terms of total mortality." Oz's comments provoked a backlash online, and he apologized, saying he had misspoken and that his goal was "to get our children safely back to school."

Political career
In 2007, it was reported that Oz had been active in his local chapter of the Republican Party of New Jersey for several years, and had donated to Republicans John McCain and Bill Frist. He supported the re-election campaign of President George W. Bush in 2004 and the candidacy of Shmuley Boteach, a rabbi who ran for Congress as a Republican in New Jersey in 2012.

In 2018, Oz was appointed to the President's Council on Sports, Fitness, and Nutrition by President Donald Trump; he was removed from the position by President Joe Biden in 2022, after Oz was asked to resign.

2022 U.S. Senate campaign

On November 30, 2021, Oz announced his candidacy for the Republican nomination for the United States Senate seat in Pennsylvania in 2022. After Oz announced his candidacy, a number of TV stations in Philadelphia, New York City, and Cleveland said that they would remove his show from the air, compelled by the FCC's equal-time rule that provide an equivalent air time to any opposing political candidates who request it. In his campaign, he called for immunologist Anthony Fauci, the Chief Medical Advisor to the President, to be fired and also opposed vaccine requirements. In March 2022, Oz was fired from the President's Council on Sports, Fitness, and Nutrition due to his candidacy for public office. Conservatives cast doubt on Oz's early candidacy due to concerns about his views and whether he was really conservative.

On April 9, 2022, Oz's campaign was endorsed by former president Donald Trump. Oz's ties to Turkey, including his dual citizenship, were criticized by his Republican primary opponents. Oz called these issues a "distraction" and said that he would renounce his Turkish citizenship if elected, while his campaign called the attacks "pathetic and xenophobic". Senate Republicans, including Lindsey Graham and Kevin Cramer, defended Oz over the issue.

In May 2022, Columbia University cut ties with Oz and removed his presence from their website. The Republican primary was held on May 17. A day after the election, Oz narrowly led his main opponent David McCormick by a difference of just 0.1% of the vote, triggering a mandatory statewide recount. When the election was still too close to call and the mail-in ballots had not yet been counted, Trump urged Oz to declare victory. On May 27, before the recount started, Oz prematurely declared victory, calling himself the presumptive nominee and opposing counting certain mailed ballots. On June 3, Oz became the Republican nominee after McCormick conceded that the recount would not make up the deficit in votes. Oz was subsequently endorsed by three out of four major Republican candidates from the primary, including McCormick, with only Kathy Barnette initially declining to endorse him. Barnette later stated that she would vote for Oz, while still declining to explicitly endorse him.

During the race, Oz's opponents accused him of carpetbagging, as he did not live in Pennsylvania prior to 2020. Oz denied these accusations, noting that he owns a home within the state. A representative of Oz's campaign also pushed back on the claims, stating "Dr. Oz lives in Pennsylvania, votes in Pennsylvania, and has his medical license in Pennsylvania. Dr. Oz grew up in the Greater Philadelphia region, less than 5 miles from the PA border. He went to school in Pennsylvania, met his wife and got married in Pennsylvania, and 2 of his children were born in Pennsylvania. He currently resides in Bryn Athyn, Pennsylvania, where his wife's family has lived for a hundred years."

On August 15, a campaign video from April of Oz shopping in a grocery store went viral. In the video, Oz says that he is shopping for produce to make crudités, and says that the perceived high prices are the fault of President Joe Biden. The video was widely ridiculed on social media and became the subject of media coverage. It was filmed at a Redner's Warehouse market, which Oz mistakenly identifies as a "Wegner's". Oz responded to criticism over the video, noting that when creating it, "I was exhausted. When you're campaigning 18 hours a day, I've gotten my kids' names wrong, as well. I don't think that's a measure of someone's ability to lead the commonwealth." Had he been elected, Oz would have been the first Muslim to serve in the U.S. Senate, the first Muslim to serve in the United States Congress as a Republican, and one of the wealthiest members of Congress.

Oz's rival candidate John Fetterman suffered a stroke in May 2022 and needed time during the campaign to recover. In late August 2022, the Oz campaign released a list of mock debate concessions it would be willing to make, saying they would "pay for any additional medical personnel [Fetterman] might need to have on standby", that Oz "promises not to intentionally hurt John's feelings", and that "at any point, John Fetterman can raise his hand and say, 'Bathroom break!. The next day, Fetterman announced that due to his recovery, he would "not be participating in a debate the first week of September"; in response, the Oz campaign said in a statement that "if John Fetterman had ever eaten a vegetable in his life, then maybe he wouldn't have had a major stroke and wouldn't be in the position of having to lie about it constantly", adding that Fetterman's statement was "whiny". Fetterman replied, "Today's statement from Dr. Oz's team made it abundantly clear that they think it is funny to mock a stroke survivor. I chose not to participate in this farce. My recovery may be a joke to Dr. Oz and his team, but it's real for me."

In September 2022, Oz called on Fetterman to participate in a debate against him before early voting begins in Pennsylvania on September 19. Fetterman agreed to debate Oz in "the middle to end of October" but would not commit to an exact date or to a debate in September. Fetterman's approach to the debate was criticized by Oz and Senator Pat Toomey. On September 15, Oz and Fetterman agreed to a single debate, which was held on October 25.

Oz lost to Fetterman in the Senate election, conceding defeat on November 9, 2022, and further urging "everyone to put down their partisan swords and focus on getting the job done".

Political positions

Making his 2022 Senate campaign announcement in late 2021, Oz identified himself as a "conservative Republican". In 2022, after his primary win, Oz described himself as "a moderate leader, but not passive."

In 2007, Oz had described himself as a "moderate Republican" and cited Arnold Schwarzenegger and Theodore Roosevelt as inspirations.

Abortion
In 2022, Oz announced that he supported overturning the 1973 Supreme Court Roe v. Wade decision and was against abortion, except for when the mother's life is in danger or in cases of rape or incest. In June 2022, he said he was "relieved" by the Supreme Court's decision in Dobbs v. Jackson Women's Health Organization. During a telephone town hall in May 2022, Oz said: "I do believe life starts at conception, and I've said that multiple times.... If life starts at conception, why do you care what stage our hearts starts beating at? It's, you know, it's still murder."

Prior to 2019, Oz had supported abortion rights, although he said that he disliked abortion on "a personal level". He said that when he was in medical school at the University of Pennsylvania, he saw the results of "traumatic... coat hanger events" in which women had been "harmed for life" before Roe. He also noted at the time that he was opposed to six-week abortion bans.

In October 2022, Oz said that "women, doctors, local political leaders" should put "ideas forward so states can decide for themselves" how to regulate abortions, but also clarified that "I don't want the federal government involved with that, at all".

COVID-19
In March 2020, Oz suggested that hydroxychloroquine, a drug typically used to treat rheumatological conditions and as an anti-malarial, could be used to treat COVID-19 as well. In April 2020, he called for the reopening of schools. Oz has however promoted the efficacy of wearing masks and of getting vaccinated against the virus.

He initially praised Anthony Fauci as a "pro" and lauded his role in combating the pandemic in 2020 and 2021. Upon running for the Senate, however, Oz changed his tone on Fauci and referred to him as a "tyrant". Oz said in 2022 when running for the Senate that "it's time we get back to normal".

Death penalty
In an October 2022 interview with NBC, Oz said that he would "potentially" support the death penalty for dealers of fentanyl.

Education
Oz is a supporter of school choice and charter schools. He has criticized the power of teachers' unions and their close relationship with the Democratic Party.

Environment and climate change
In 2017, Oz co-authored an article that highlighted the threats of climate change including extreme heat, wildfires and floods. When running for the Senate, he downplayed the risk that carbon dioxide poses when contributing to the role of the greenhouse effect in contributing to climate change. In a March 2022 campaign event, Oz claimed that carbon dioxide is "not the problem"—overlooking the fact that carbon dioxide levels are higher than they have been in at least 3 million years, and that 0.04% of the atmosphere constitutes billions of tons of heat-trapping gas.

In 2022, Oz said that he supports the process of hydraulic fracturing ("fracking") and believes that natural gas can help the United States become energy independent and reduce gasoline prices. In keeping with this view, he says he supports reducing environmental regulations on fracking. However, in 2014, Oz had called for more regulations on fracking, including halting the practice until the environmental impact had been researched more, because of the possible connection between fracking and the pollution of air and waterways.

Foreign policy
Oz has ties to Turkey’s authoritarian Justice and Development Party, ties that include foreign agents and proxies. Oz was accused of operating a secret lobby in the U.S. and spying on American citizens.

China
In 2013, Oz had celebrated a partnership with Neusoft Xikang, the health technology subsidiary of Chinese tech company Neusoft, serving as their chief health officer in the process. Neusoft CEO Liu Jiren said that his company's partnership with Oz "marks a perfect combination of leading health management methodologies and innovative technology platform." 

Since declaring his senate campaign, though, Oz has taken a "tough on China" stance similar to the Trump wing of the Republican Party. A key part of his campaign during the primaries was attacking rival David McCormick's business ties to mainland China.

Israel
In 2022, Oz said that Israel is "an ally and a vibrant democracy in the world's most troubled region" and that he opposes the BDS Movement, supports keeping the US Embassy in Jerusalem and supports continued military aid to Israel. Oz has long been a supporter of Israel and visited the country in 2013. When speaking about the Israeli–Palestinian conflict in an interview with The Forward, Oz said "It's not black and white. The ultimate solution will be driven by financial means. Peace is an imperative for that. When people love their children so much, they'll do whatever it takes to make their future brighter."

Ukraine
Oz condemned the 2022 Russian invasion of Ukraine, calling it "horrible" and "preventable".

Gun policy
Oz has said that he supports the constitutional right to bear arms under the Second Amendment. At a campaign event in February 2022, Oz said that he supports red flag-style laws for those expressing dangerous behavior, but opposes a national red flag law registry. Previously, in 2017, Oz had expressed support for waiting periods before someone can acquire a gun, and in 2019 he co-wrote a column that called for the United States to ban assault rifles altogether.

Healthcare
In 2022, Oz said that he would vote to repeal the Affordable Care Act if he were elected to the Senate, and backed Medicare Advantage Plus.

By contrast, in 2009, Oz said "It should be mandatory that everybody in America have healthcare coverage. If you can't afford it, we have to give it to you..." And in 2010, Oz supported a government-backed healthcare system and was featured in an advertisement that promoted The Affordable Care Act, also known as Obamacare. Oz has said that the healthcare systems that he thinks work the best are Germany and Switzerland, which are both universal healthcare systems.

Regarding those without healthcare coverage, Oz said they "don't have a right to health, but they have a right to access, to get that health."

LGBTQ rights
In 2010, Oz hosted and offered support to transgender youth and their families on his television show. In 2012, after facing criticism for hosting a guest who supported pseudoscientific reparative or conversion therapy on his show, he announced that he is opposed to conversion therapy and called conversion therapy "dangerous". Oz also had guests from GLAAD on his show who spoke out against conversion therapy.

As a Senate candidate, Oz endorsed enacting federal protections of same-sex marriage. In April 2022, Oz supported legislation to prohibit transgender people from participating in sports that are divided by gender-based categories rather than sex-based categories. In May 2022, he said that a transgender youth movement is based on "false science", while not supporting a ban on hormone blockers, adding that the doctor and family should decide, rather than politicians.

Marijuana
In 2014, Oz said on Larry King Live that "marijuana is hugely beneficial when used correctly for medicinal purposes" and in 2017 criticized the federal government for classifying marijuana as a Schedule I drug, which prevents more scientific research on marijuana. 
While running for the Senate in 2022, Oz said he opposes the legalization of recreational cannabis, but was not against it for medical purposes. In an interview with NBC News, Oz expressed support for President Joe Biden's effort to pardon those convicted of simple marijuana possession at the federal level.

Personal life
Oz is fluent in English and Turkish. His net worth is between $76 million and $500 million.

In August 2010, Oz was diagnosed with a pre-cancerous polyp in the colon during a routine colonoscopy which was performed as part of his show. Oz said that the procedure likely saved his life.

In 2019, Oz played for the Home roster during the NBA All-Star Celebrity Game at the Bojangles' Coliseum in Charlotte, North Carolina. The roster was made up of celebrities with Carolina roots. He previously played in the 2010 NBA All-Star Celebrity Game. Also in 2019, Oz played for Team Cleveland in Major League Baseball's All-Star Legends & Celebrity Softball Game at Progressive Field in Cleveland.

Residency
Oz was born in Cleveland, Ohio, and raised in Wilmington, Delaware. He lived with his wife, Lisa, in Cliffside Park, New Jersey, for several decades, and holds his medical license within Pennsylvania.

In late 2020, Oz moved to Pennsylvania and changed his voter registration to his in-laws' home in Bryn Athyn, where he says he pays market price rent. He has since voted twice in Pennsylvania and acquired a Pennsylvanian driver's license and a Pennsylvania concealed carry permit.

Oz and his wife own at least ten properties throughout the United States and Turkey, including an estate in Palm Beach, Florida valued between $5 million and $25 million, and a cattle farm in Okeechobee, Florida.

Citizenship
Oz is a dual citizen of the U.S. and Turkey. He has said that he maintains his Turkish citizenship to care for his ailing mother with Alzheimer's, but Oz expressed he would renounce it before being sworn in if he was ultimately elected to the Senate. There is no U.S. law which forbids members of Congress from being dual citizens.

Family

Oz married his wife, Lisa Oz, an author and television personality, in 1985. The two met in Philadelphia through their fathers, while Oz was attending the University of Pennsylvania. According to Oz, he proposed to her on a city street corner, using a tab from a discarded soda can as a makeshift ring. The couple have four children together, including eldest daughter Daphne, who is also an author and television host. Oz and his wife founded HealthCorps, a non-profit organization for health education and peer mentoring.

In November 2020, Oz was sued by his sister Nazlim Öz. Nazlim alleged that he was withholding her rental income from apartments owned by their late father Mustafa Öz. Oz said that he was forced to hold payments from the apartments in escrow, as their mother and other relatives were suing Nazlim in Turkish probate court over the distribution of Mustafa Öz's estate.

Religion
, Oz identifies as "secular Muslim" and, according to the Associated Press, "has said that the spiritual side of Islam resonates with him more than the religious law side of it." Oz has expressed to CBN News his opposition to Sharia law in the US. Noting that his wife and children are Christians, Oz told CBN that he believes that the U.S. was founded on Judeo-Christian values. Oz aligns his personal Muslim religious views with Sufism. His wife Lisa introduced Oz to the teachings of the 18th-century Swedish theologian Emanuel Swedenborg as well as to alternative medicines or Eastern mysticisms such as reiki and transcendental meditation.

In a 2012 interview with Henry Louis Gates Jr., Oz said that his father strictly followed Islam, while his mother was a secular Kemalist.

Public reception

Oz has faced criticism for his promotion of pseudoscience, homeopathy, and alternative medicine. Popular Science and The New Yorker have published critical articles on Oz for giving "non-scientific" advice. HuffPost has accused Oz of promoting quackery.

A 2014 study published in the British Medical Journal found that medical talk shows such as The Dr. Oz Show and The Doctors often lack adequate information on the specific benefits or evidence of their claims. Forty episodes of each program from early 2013 were evaluated, determining that evidence supported 46 percent, contradicted 15 percent, and was not found for 39 percent of the recommendations on The Dr Oz Show. Unfounded claims included saying apple juice had unsafe levels of arsenic and cell phones could cause breast cancer.

Oz was awarded the James Randi Educational Foundation's Pigasus Award 2009 for his promotion of Reiki. However, he used Reiki as a moral support to patients in operating room, not for replacing any medical procedure and pointed out that he was unfairly attacked.

Oz has been criticized for the guests he has invited onto The Dr. Oz Show, including psychics, faith healers, peddlers of unproven or disproven medical treatments, and anti-vaccination activists, including Joseph Mercola, Robert F. Kennedy Jr., and Christiane Northrup.

From 1999 to 2004, Oz was named a "Global Leader of Tomorrow" by the World Economic Forum and was listed on Time Magazine's "100 Most Influential People" of 2008. He has been nominated for ten Daytime Emmy Awards for Outstanding Talk Show Host since The Dr. Oz Show premiered in 2009, and has won the award four times (in 2010, 2011, 2014 and 2016).

Awards and honors
Emmy Awards

People's Choice Awards

Other

Writings
Eight of Oz's books have been New York Times bestsellers; seven were written with Michael F. Roizen. He has a regular column in Esquire magazine and O, The Oprah Magazine and his article "Retool, Reboot, and Rebuild" was awarded the 2009 National Magazine Award for Personal Service. Oz and the Hearst Corporation launched the bi-monthly magazine Dr. Oz The Good Life on February 4, 2014.

Bibliography
Healing from the Heart: A Leading Surgeon Combines Eastern and Western Traditions to Create the Medicine of the Future, by Mehmet Oz, Ron Arias, Dean Ornish, 1999, .
Complementary and Alternative Cardiovascular Medicine: Clinical Handbook, by Richard A. Stein (Editor), Mehmet, M.D. Oz (Editor), 2004, .
YOU: The Owner's Manual: An Insider's Guide to the Body that Will Make You Healthier and Younger, by Michael F. Roizen, Mehmet C. Oz, 2005, .
YOU: On a Diet: The Owner's Manual for Waist Management, by Michael F. Roizen, Mehmet C. Oz, 2006, .
YOU: The Smart Patient: An Insider's Handbook for Getting the Best Treatment, by Michael F. Roizen, Mehmet C. Oz, 2006, .
YOU: Staying Young: The Owner's Manual for Extending Your Warranty, by Michael F. Roizen, Mehmet C. Oz, 2007, .
YOU: Being Beautiful: The Owner's Manual to Inner and Outer Beauty, by Michael F. Roizen, Mehmet C. Oz, 2008, .
YOU: Breathing Easy: Meditation and Breathing Techniques to Help You Relax, Refresh, and Revitalize, by Michael F. Roizen, Mehmet C. Oz, 2008.
YOU: Having a Baby: The Owner's Manual from Conception to Delivery and More, by Michael F. Roizen, Mehmet C. Oz, 2009.
Minimally Invasive Cardiac Surgery, by Mehmet C. Oz, 2010, .

Filmography

Film

Television

Electoral history

See also
 List of American Muslims
 Medical journalism
 New Yorkers in journalism

Notes

References

Further reading
  Discussion with Michael Specter about his profile of Oz.

External links

 
 
 Mehmet Oz at Politifact

1960 births
20th-century American male writers
20th-century American non-fiction writers
20th-century Muslims
21st-century American educators
21st-century American male writers
21st-century American non-fiction writers
21st-century Muslims
American cardiac surgeons
American columnists
American company founders
American health and wellness writers
American health care businesspeople
American magazine writers
American male non-fiction writers
American medical writers
American people of Circassian descent
American people of Turkish descent
American Sufis
Articles containing video clips
Candidates in the 2022 United States Senate elections
Celebrity doctors
Citizens of Turkey through descent
Columbia University faculty
Daytime Emmy Award for Outstanding Talk Show Host winners
Harvard University alumni
Journalists from Ohio
Living people
Medical educators
Muslim supporters of Israel
Muslim writers
New Jersey Republicans
NewYork–Presbyterian Hospital physicians
Pennsylvania Republicans
People from Cliffside Park, New Jersey
People with multiple nationality
Perelman School of Medicine at the University of Pennsylvania alumni
Physicians from Cleveland
Physicians from New Jersey
Pseudoscientific diet advocates
Radio personalities from New Jersey
Shapsugs
Tower Hill School alumni
Turkish Army personnel
Turkish people of Circassian descent
Turkish Sufis
Wharton School of the University of Pennsylvania alumni
Writers from Cleveland
Writers from New Jersey
Writers from Wilmington, Delaware
Politicians from Montgomery County, Pennsylvania